Jens Quorning is a Danish multihull designer and head of Dragonfly Trimarans, a position in which he succeeded his father Børge Quorning.

Designs
Partial list.
Dragonfly 28

See also

Dragonfly Trimarans

References

Multihull designers
Danish yacht designers
Year of birth missing (living people)
Living people